Rathfarnham Castle is a 16th-century fortified house in Rathfarnham, South Dublin, Ireland.

The earlier Irish castle was occupied by the Harold family, who held it as tenants of the le Bret family. It was replaced by the present building built on lands confiscated from the Eustace family of Baltinglass, to whom it had passed, because of their involvement in the Second Desmond Rebellion. The Geraldines defended the Pale from the Irish clans in the nearby Wicklow Mountains. It is believed the present castle was built around 1583 for Archbishop Adam Loftus. Originally a semi-fortified and battlemented structure it underwent extensive alterations in the 18th century.

On a level with the entrance hall are the 18th-century reception rooms and above this floor, the former ballroom, later converted into a chapel.

Rathfarnham was described as a "waste village" when Loftus bought it. His new castle was not long built when in 1600 it had to withstand an attack by the Wicklow clans during the Nine Years' War.

English Civil war

Archbishop Loftus left the castle to his son, Dudley and it then passed to his son Adam in 1616. During Adam's ownership, the castle came under siege in the 1641 rebellion. It was able to hold out against the Confederate army when the surrounding country was overrun. Adam Loftus opposed the treaty of cessation in order to stop the fighting between the Irish Confederates and the English Royalists. Consequently, he was imprisoned in Dublin Castle.

During the subsequent Irish Confederate Wars (1641–53), the castle changed hands several times. From 1641 to 1647, it was garrisoned by English Royalist troops. In 1647, Ormonde, commander of the Royalists in Ireland, surrendered Dublin to the English Parliament and Parliamentary troops were stationed at the castle until 1649 when a few days before the Battle of Rathmines, the castle was stormed and taken without a fight by the Royalists as part of the Siege of Dublin. However, the Roundheads re-occupied it after their victory at the Battle of Rathmines. It has also been reported that Oliver Cromwell held a council there during his campaign in Ireland before going south to besiege Wexford. Adam Loftus, who recovered his castle and lands under Cromwell, sided with the Parliamentarians and was killed at the Siege of Limerick in 1651.

After the English Civil War, the Loftus family retained ownership of the castle. In 1659, Dr. Dudley Loftus, great-grandson of Archbishop Loftus, took over the castle. During his lifetime, Dudley held the posts of Commissioner of Revenue, Judge of the Court of Admiralty, Master in Chancery, representative for Kildare & Wicklow in the Protectorate Parliament and MP for Naas, Bannow and Fethard (Co Wexford).

His body is interred at St. Patrick's Cathedral.

The eighteenth century
 The property then passed by marriage to Philip Wharton. The young man lost his money in the South Sea Bubble and in 1723 the castle was sold for £62,000 to the Right Hon William Conolly, speaker of the Irish House of Commons. 
In 1742, it was sold to Dr. Hoadly, Archbishop of Armagh, and on his death four years later it passed to his son-in-law Bellingham Boyle. In 1767, Boyle sold the property to Nicholas Hume-Loftus, second Earl of Ely, a descendant of Adam Loftus, the original builder of the castle. 
Nicholas died within a few years, probably as an indirect result of great hardships which he had suffered in his youth, and the estate passed to his uncle, Hon. Henry Loftus, who was created Earl of Ely in 1771. In commemoration of regaining ownership, the Loftus family constructed another entrance for the castle in the form of a Roman Triumphal Arch. The arch can still be viewed from nearby Dodder Park Road. Henry Loftus, Earl of Ely was responsible for much of the conversion of the medieval fortress into a Georgian mansion and employed renowned architects Sir William Chambers and James 'Athenian' Stuart to carry out these works. The mullioned windows were enlarged and the battlements replaced by a coping with ornamental urns. A semi-circular extension was added to the east side and an entrance porch approached by steps, on the north. The interior was decorated in accordance with the tastes of the period and leading artists, including Angelica Kauffman were employed in the work. Writers of the period who visited the house have left extravagant descriptions of its splendour.

Henry died in 1783 and was succeeded by his nephew Charles Tottenham. He subsequently became Marquess of Ely as a reward for his vote at the time of the Union.

The nineteenth and twentieth centuries
In 1812, the family leased the estate to the Ropers and removed their valuable possessions to Loftus Hall in Wexford. The lands and castle were then used for dairy farming and fell into disrepair. To quote a contemporary account from 1838:
Crossing the Dodder by a ford, and proceeding along its southern bank towards Rathfarnham, a splendid gateway at left, accounted among the best productions of that species of architecture in Ireland, invites the tourist to explore the once beautiful grounds of Rathfarnham Castle, but they are now all eloquently waste, the undulating hills covered with rank herbage, the rivulet stagnant and sedgy, the walks scarce traceable, the ice-houses open to the prying sun, the fish-pond clogged with weeds, while the mouldering architecture of the castle, and the crumbling, unsightly offices in its immediate vicinity,…The castle, so long the residence of the Loftus family, and still the property of the Marquis of Ely, subject, however, to a small chief rent to Mr. Conolly, is an extensive fabric,.....The great hall is entered from a terrace, by a portico of eight Doric columns, which support a dome, painted in fresco with the signs of the Zodiac and other devices. This room was ornamented with antique and modern busts, placed on pedestals of variegated marble, and has three windows of stained gloss, in one of which is an escutcheon of the Loftus arms, with quarterings finely executed. Several other apartments exhibited considerable splendour of arrangement, and contained, until lately, numerous family portraits, and a valuable collection of paintings by ancient masters. But, when it is mentioned, that this structure has been for years a public dairy, and the grounds to the extent of  converted to its uses, some notion may be formed of their altered condition.

In 1852 it was bought by the Lord Chancellor, Francis Blackburne whose family resided there for three generations. The property developers Bailey & Gibson acquired the castle in 1912 and divided up the estate. The eastern part became the Castle Golf Club, the castle and the southwestern portion were bought in 1913 by the Jesuit Order and the northwestern part was devoted to housing.

The Jesuits are an order renowned for their education and one of them; Father O'Leary S.J. constructed a seismograph. This machine could detect earth tremors and earthquakes from anywhere in the world and for a time, Rathfarnham Castle became a source of earthquake information for the national media. Jesuits would spend their Tertianship at Rathfarnham.

To the north of the castle was a long vaulted chamber formerly known as Cromwell’s Court or Fort. In 1922, it was incorporated into the new retreat house, to which it formed the ground story and its character concealed from the outside by a uniform covering of cement plaster.

Not far from the Golf Club House was an attractive little temple built of stone and brick, another relic of Lord Ely's occupation of Rathfarnham. Although rather out of repair, if restored, it would have added much to the charm of this part of the links. Unfortunately, by decision of the committee, it was demolished in 1979.

In 1986, the Jesuits sold Rathfarnham Castle but before leaving, they removed the stained glass windows, made in the famous Harry Clarke studios, from the chapel and donated them to Tullamore Catholic Church which had been destroyed by fire in 1983. The other windows were donated to Our Lady's Hospice, Harold's Cross and Temple Street Children's Hospital, Dublin.

Preservation
The castle was sold to Delaware Properties in 1985 and it was feared that it was facing demolition. After immense public pressure to save the building, in 1987 it was purchased by the State and declared a National Monument. Currently, the Office of Public Works is carrying out extensive refurbishment throughout the castle but it is still open to the public during the summer months (5 May - 12 October). The Castle is presented undergoing active conservation, where visitors can see at first-hand tantalising glimpses of layers of its earlier existence uncovered during research.

References

External links

 Rathfarnham Castle - official site at Heritage Ireland
  The Ely Papers, PRONI
Much of the text in this article is taken, with permission, from
 Rathfarnham On-Line
 https://www.webcitation.org/query?url=http://www.geocities.com/jorgenpfhartogs/Rathfarnham_Castle.html&date=2009-10-26+01:01:04
 South Dublin Libraries and Archeology, Early Christian Remains and Local Histories, Chapter 10, by Patrick Healy.

Rathfarnham
National Monuments in County Dublin
Castles in South Dublin (county)
Museums in South Dublin (county)
Historic house museums in the Republic of Ireland
Buildings and structures in South Dublin (county)